William Tecumseh Davies (December 20, 1831 – September 21, 1912) was an American lawyer and politician who served as a Pennsylvania state senator and as the fourth lieutenant governor of Pennsylvania from 1887 to 1891.

Davies was born in Glamorgan, Wales. His family emigrated to Towanda, Pennsylvania, in his youth. He volunteered to serve in the Union Army in the American Civil War and rose to the rank of captain but received a medical discharge in 1863. He was admitted to the bar as an attorney in 1861 and was elected as district attorney of Bradford County, Pennsylvania, in 1865.

A member of the Republican Party, Davies was later elected to two terms as a member of the Pennsylvania State Senate representing Bradford and Wyoming counties from 1877 to 1885.

References

External links
The Political Graveyard

1831 births
1912 deaths
People from Glamorgan
Lieutenant Governors of Pennsylvania
Republican Party Pennsylvania state senators
Pennsylvania lawyers
Welsh emigrants to the United States
19th-century American politicians
19th-century American lawyers